Wassim Ben Tara (born 3 August 1996) is a Tunisian professional volleyball player of Polish descent. He is a member of the Tunisia national team. At the professional club level, he plays for PSG Stal Nysa.

Honours

Clubs
 CEV Challenge Cup
  2016/2017 – with Chaumont VB 52
 National championships
 2016/2017  French Championship, with Chaumont VB 52
 2017/2018  French SuperCup, with Chaumont VB 52

Youth national team
 2013  CAVB U21 African Championship
 2014  CAVB U23 African Championship

Individual awards
 2021: CAVB African Championship – Best Spiker

References

External links
 
 
 Player profile at PlusLiga.pl 
 Player profile at Volleybox.net

1996 births
Living people
People from Tunis
Naturalized citizens of Poland
Tunisian men's volleyball players
Olympic volleyball players of Tunisia
Volleyball players at the 2020 Summer Olympics
Tunisian expatriate sportspeople in France
Expatriate volleyball players in France
Tunisian expatriate sportspeople in Poland
Expatriate volleyball players in Poland
Stal Nysa players
Opposite hitters